There are at least 6 named mountains in Sheridan County, Montana.
 Brush Mountain, el. 
 Flagstaff Hill, el. 
 Kisler Butte, el. 
 Sand Butte, location unknown, el. 
 Sand Hills, location unknown, el. 
 Umbrights Hill, el.

See also
 List of mountains in Montana

Notes

Landforms of Sheridan County, Montana
Sheridan